The 1991 WAFU Club Championship was the fifteenth football club tournament season that took place for the runners-up or third place of each West African country's domestic league, the West African Club Championship. It was won by Ivory Coast's Africa Sports after defeating Nigeria's Lobi Bank in the away leg 2-1 as the home leg had a goal draw.  A total of about 62 goals were scored, making it a record. Africa Sports defeated Buffles du Borgou 0-7 and made the highest scoring match to date, and accounting for around 10% of the total goals scored. Originally a 24 match season, it was reduced to 23 matches as ASEC Nouadhbihou (now part of FC Nouadhibou) withdrew in a second match with Lobi Bank. No club from Gambia or Liberia participated.

Preliminary round

|}

Quarterfinals

|}

Semifinals

|}

Finals

|}

Winners

See also
1991 African Cup of Champions Clubs
1991 CAF Cup Winners' Cup

Notes

References

External links
Full results of the 1991 WAFU Club Championship at RSSSF

West African Club Championship
1991 in African football